The three teams in this group played against each other on a home-and-away basis. The group winner Hungary qualified for the sixth FIFA World Cup held in Sweden.

Table

Matches

References

External links
FIFA official page
RSSSF - 1958 World Cup Qualification
Allworldcup

3
1957 in Norwegian football
1956–57 in Hungarian football
qual
1956–57 in Bulgarian football
1957–58 in Bulgarian football